Ken Eriksen is an American softball coach who is the current head coach of the University of South Florida Bulls and former manager of the United States women's national softball team.

Early life and education 
Eriksen graduated high school from Ward Melville High School in East Setauket, New York. Eriksen attended the University of South Florida where he was a member of their baseball team. He graduated from USF in 1984 with a degree in political science. He later returned to South Florida to earn his master's degree in public administration.

Playing career 
While at USF, Eriksen played in five different positions, mainly as a pitcher and a catcher. He amassed a career .315 batting average and 2.48 ERA.

After graduating, Eriksen began playing fastpitch softball. In 1986 he was signed by the Clearwater Bombers of the American Softball Association, where he played until 1992. Eriksen also played for the Larry Miller-Toyota team of the ASA from 1993 to 1995 and the Tampa Smokers from 1996 to 1997, after which he retired from playing to become the head coach of USF softball. He also played for the United States men's national softball team where he won silver at the 1991 Pan American Games.

Eriksen was named a First Team All-World catcher in 1992.

Coaching career

South Florida 
While still within a six-year stint with the Clearwater Bombers, Ken Eriksen became the assistant coach of his alma mater's softball team in 1989 under legendary coach Hildred Deese, who led the Bulls to back-to-back national championships in 1983 and 1984. After Deese retired, Eriksen took over as the second softball coach in USF history in 1997. Under his guide, the Bulls have won eight conference titles, made 15 NCAA tournament appearances, and a Women's College World Series appearance in 2012. Also during his time as coach, USF pitchers have thrown three perfect games and 19 no hitters (not including no hitters that were also perfect games). The Bulls have completed 16 seasons with 40 or more wins under Eriksen, including six seasons with 50 or more wins and one of those seasons coming with 60 or more wins. He became the 28th coach in NCAA Division I softball history to win 1,000 games on April 30, 2021, with pitcher Geogina Corrick throwing a no hitter in the win over conference foe ECU.

Team USA 
Eriksen was named as an assistant coach for the United States women's softball team in 2002. With him as an assistant, Team USA won gold medals at the ISF Women's Softball World Championship twice, World Cup of Softball twice, Pan American Games once, and Olympic Games once. In 2011, Eriksen became the head coach of Team USA. Since he took over, the team has won gold medals at the ISF Women's Softball World Championship twice, World Cup of Softball six times, and Pan American Games twice.

Head coaching record

College

References

Living people
American softball coaches
South Florida Bulls baseball players
South Florida Bulls softball coaches
Year of birth missing (living people)
United States women's national softball team coaches